Sugar Cane, was a three-decker merchantman and convict ship. In 1793 she transported convicts from Ireland to Australia. On her return trip she sailed from Bengal to Britain under contract to the British East India Company. During the French Revolutionary Wars she sailed under a letter of marque as a slave ship. She made two voyages taking slaves from West Africa to the Americas. In 1796 or 1797, on her second slave trading voyage she captured a French ship, but shortly thereafter was herself captured. The British Royal Navy recaptured her and she apparently was returned to service. She is last listed in 1798.

Career
She was launched in 1786 upon the Thames River. In 1789 Lloyd's Register showed her master as W. Seaton, her owners as Turner and Co., and her trade as London-St Vincent. She was coppered in 1793.

Under the command of Thomas Musgrave, she sailed from Portsmouth for Ireland, on 9 March 1793. Having embarked with 110 male and 50 female convicts, she left Cork, Ireland, on 12 April 1793. A sergeant's party from the New South Wales Corps provided the guards for the convicts.

On 25 May the Government's agent had a prisoner executed. The man had managed to get out of his irons and another prisoner had accused the man of planning a mutiny. Sugar Cane arrived at Rio de Janeiro in late June and left on 13 July.

Sugar Cane arrived at Port Jackson, New South Wales on 17 September 1793. Other than the man who had been executed, no convicts died on the voyage, and the prisoners arrived in good health.

The vessels separated at some point, and Sugar Cane went on to discover some islands in the Caroline archipelago. The islands were the Pingelap atoll, now part of Pohnpei State of the Federated States of Micronesia.

Sugar Cane left Calcutta on 15 May 1794. She reached Madras on 29 June, the Cape on 4 October, St Helena on 25 October, Crookhaven on 25 December, and Kinsale on 31 January. She arrived at the Downs on 27 February.

On 18 July 1795, John Marman received a letter of marque for Sugar Cane. The letter of marque authorized Sugar Cane to engage in offensive action against French shipping should the opportunity arise. Lloyd's Register for 1795 shows her master changing from Musgrave to "J. Manning". and her trade changing to London-Africa. 

Marman sailed Sugar Cane from London on 29 July 1795, bound for he Gold Coast. She arrived at Cape Coast Castle on 21 September. She gathered her slaves there and arrived 5 January 1796 at Montevideo, in the Rio de la Plata with 228. She arrived back at London on 10 June.

Marman received a second letter of marque on 1 July 1796. Sugar Cane, with Marman, master, then sailed to the Gold Coast again to gather slaves. She arrived at Cape Coast Castle on 30 September.

On her way, Sugar Cane recaptured Harlequin, which the French had captured as she was sailing from Liverpool to Africa. Sugar Cane sent Harlequin into Cape Coast.

In 1797 Lloyd's Register still showed  Sugar Cane, Manning, master, with trade Liverpool-Africa.

Recapture and subsequent career
The French renamed Sugar Cane Marseilloise (or Marsellois). However, in October 1797  and  recaptured Marsellois as she was sailing from Guadeloupe to France. They then took the richly-laden former Sugar Cane into Martinique.

Sugar Cane was restored to her former owners, who revived her name. Although there is a report that she was loaned out to transport convicts, there is no record of that. A Sugarcane, Campbell, master, did arrive at Port Jackson on 15 October 1798 with a cargo of provisions. She then sailed for India, no date of departure being given.

Sugar Cane is no longer listed in the 1798 Lloyd's Register.

Notes, citations, and references
Notes

Citations

References
 
Brigham, William Tufts (1900) An Index to the Islands of the Pacific Ocean: A Handbook to the Chart on the Walls of the Bernice Pauahi Bishop Museum of Polynesian Ethnology and Natural History. (Bishop Museum Press)
Findlay, A.G. (1851; reprinted 2013) A Directory for the Navigation of the Pacific Ocean, with Descriptions of Its Coasts, Islands, Etc.: From the Strait of Magalhaens to the Arctic Sea, and Those of Asia and Australia. (Cambridge University). 
 
 

1786 ships
Ships built on the River Thames
Convict ships to New South Wales
Ships of the British East India Company
London slave ships
Captured ships
Mutinies